Raven Klaasen and Rajeev Ram were the defending champions and successfully defended their title, defeating Łukasz Kubot and Alexander Peya in the final, 7–6(7–5), 6–2.

Seeds

Draw

Draw

Qualifying

Seeds

Qualifiers
  Brian Baker /  Denis Istomin

Lucky losers
  Santiago González /  Scott Lipsky

Qualifying draw

References
 Main Draw
 Qualifying Draw

2016 Gerry Weber Open